A list of populated places in Adana Province, Turkey by district:

Aladağ

Aladağ
Akören, Aladağ
Boztahta, Aladağ
Büyüksofulu
Ceritler
Darılık
Dayılar, Aladağ
Dölekli
Eğner
Gerdibi
Kabasakal
Karahan
Kıcak 
Kışlak, Aladağ 
Kızıldam 
Kökez 
Küp
Madenli
Mazılık
Topallı
Uzunkuyu
Yetimli
Yüksekören
Gökçeköy  
Ebrişim
Köprücük
Posyağbasan
Gireğiyeniköy

Ceyhan

Adapınar, Ceyhan
Akdam, Ceyhan
Altıgöz, Ceyhan
Altıkara, Ceyhan
Azizli, Ceyhan
Ağaçlı, Ceyhan
Ağaçpınar, Ceyhan
Başören, Ceyhan
Burhanlı, Ceyhan
Büyükburhaniye, Ceyhan
Büyükmangıt, Ceyhan
Camızağılı, Ceyhan
Ceyhan
Ceyhanbekirli, Ceyhan
Dağıstan, Ceyhan
Degirmenli, Ceyhan
Değirmendere, Ceyhan
Dikilitaş, Ceyhan
Dokuztekne, Ceyhan
Dumlu, Ceyhan
Durhasandede, Ceyhan
Dutlupınar, Ceyhan
Ekinyazı, Ceyhan
Elmagölü, Ceyhan
Erenler, Ceyhan
Gümürdülü, Ceyhan
Gündoğan, Ceyhan
Günlüce, Ceyhan
Günyazı, Ceyhan
Hamdilli, Ceyhan
Hamidiye, Ceyhan
Hamitbey, Ceyhan
Hamitbeybucağı, Ceyhan
Irmaklı, Ceyhan
Isırganlı, Ceyhan
Karakayalı, Ceyhan
Kurtkulağı, Ceyhan
Kurtpınar, Ceyhan
Kurtpınarı, Ceyhan
Kuzucak, Ceyhan
Köprülü, Ceyhan
Körkuyu, Ceyhan
Kösreli, Ceyhan
Küçükburhaniye, Ceyhan
Küçükmangıt, Ceyhan
Kılıçkaya, Ceyhan
Kıvrıklı, Ceyhan
Kızıldere, Ceyhan
Mercimek, Ceyhan
Mustafabeyli, Ceyhan
Narlık, Ceyhan
Sarıbahçe, Ceyhan
Sarıkeçili, Ceyhan
Sağkaya, Ceyhan
Sağırlar, Ceyhan
Selimiye, Ceyhan
Sirkeli, Ceyhan
Soysalı, Ceyhan
Soğukpınar, Ceyhan
Tatarlı, Ceyhan
Tatlıkuyu, Ceyhan
Toktamış, Ceyhan
Yalak, Ceyhan
Yellibel, Ceyhan
Yeniköynazımbey, Ceyhan
Yeşilbahçe, Ceyhan
Yeşildam, Ceyhan
Yılankale, Ceyhan
Çakaldere, Ceyhan
Çataklı, Ceyhan
Çatalhüyük, Ceyhan
Çevretepe, Ceyhan
Çiftlikler, Ceyhan
Çiçekli, Ceyhan
Çokçapınar, Ceyhan
Üçdutyeşilova, Ceyhan
İmran, Ceyhan
İncetarla, Ceyhan
İnceyer, Ceyhan
İsalı, Ceyhan

Çukurova

Çukurova
Bozcalar, Çukurova
Dörtler, Çukurova
Fadıl, Çukurova
Kabasakal, Çukurova
Karahan, Çukurova
Kaşoba, Çukurova
Küçükçınar, Çukurova
Memişli, Çukurova
Örcün, Çukurova
Pirili, Çukurova
Söğütlü, Çukurova
Şambayadı, Çukurova

Feke

Akkaya, Feke
Akoluk, Feke
Bahçecik, Feke
Bağdatlı, Feke
Değirmenciuşağı, Feke
Feke
Gaffaruşağı, Feke
Gedikli, Feke
Göbelli, Feke
Görbeyaz, Feke
Gürümze, Feke
Güzpınarı, Feke
Hıdıruşağı, Feke
Kaleyüzü, Feke
Kayadibi, Feke
Kaşaltı, Feke
Konakkuran, Feke
Kovukçınar, Feke
Koçyazı, Feke
Kırıkuşağı, Feke
Kısacıklı, Feke
Kızılyer, Feke
Mansurlu, Feke
Mansurlu-bucak merkezi, Feke
Musalar, Feke
Olucak, Feke
Ormancık, Feke
Ortaköy, Feke
Oruçlu, Feke
Paşalı, Feke
Süphandere, Feke
Tenkerli, Feke
Tokmanaklı, Feke
Tortulu, Feke
Uğurlubağ, Feke
Yaylapınar, Feke
Yerebakan, Feke
Çandırlar, Feke
Çondu, Feke
Çürükler, Feke
İncirci, Feke
Şahmuratlı, Feke

Karaisalı

Aktaş, Karaisalı
Akçalı, Karaisalı
Altınova, Karaisalı
Ayakkıf, Karaisalı
Aşağıbelemedik, Karaisalı
Aşağıyirikler, Karaisalı
Barakdağı, Karaisalı
Başkıf, Karaisalı
Bekirli, Karaisalı
Beydemir, Karaisalı
Bolacalı, Karaisalı
Boztahta, Karaisalı
Bucak, Karaisalı
Demirçit, Karaisalı
Durak, Karaisalı
Emelcik, Karaisalı
Etekli, Karaisalı
Eğlence, Karaisalı
Gildirli, Karaisalı
Gökhasanlı, Karaisalı
Gökkuyu, Karaisalı
Gülüşlü, Karaisalı
Güvenç, Karaisalı
Hacılı, Karaisalı
Hacımusalı, Karaisalı
Kaledağı, Karaisalı
Kapıkaya, Karaisalı
Karahasanlı, Karaisalı
Karaisalı
Karakuyu, Karaisalı
Karakılıç, Karaisalı
Karayusuflu, Karaisalı
Kocaveliler, Karaisalı
Kuyucu, Karaisalı
Kuzgun, Karaisalı
Kuşcusofulu, Karaisalı
Körüklü, Karaisalı
Kösefakılı, Karaisalı
Kıralan, Karaisalı
Kırıklı, Karaisalı
Maraşlı, Karaisalı
Murtçukuru, Karaisalı
Nergizlik, Karaisalı
Nuhlu, Karaisalı
Sadıkali, Karaisalı
Salbaş, Karaisalı
Sarıkonak, Karaisalı
Tatık, Karaisalı
Topaktaş, Karaisalı
Topraklı, Karaisalı
Torunsolaklı, Karaisalı
Tümenli, Karaisalı
Yazıbaşı, Karaisalı
Çakallı, Karaisalı
Çatalan, Karaisalı
Çevlik, Karaisalı
Çocuklar, Karaisalı
Çorlu, Karaisalı
Çukur, Karaisalı
Ömerli, Karaisalı

Karataş

Adalı, Karataş
Ataköy, Karataş
Bahçe, Karataş
Bebeli, Karataş
Beyköyü, Karataş
Cırık, Karataş
Damlapınar, Karataş
Develiören, Karataş
Dolaplı, Karataş
Eğriağaç, Karataş
Gökçeli, Karataş
Gölkaya, Karataş
Gümüşyazı, Karataş
Hacıhasan, Karataş
Hasırağacı, Karataş
Helvacı, Karataş
Kamışlı, Karataş
Kapı, Karataş
Karagöçer, Karataş
Karataş, Karataş
Karataş, Adana
Kesik, Karataş
Kiremitli, Karataş
Köprügözü, Karataş
Kırhasan, Karataş
Kızıltahta, Karataş
Meletmez, Karataş
Oymaklı, Karataş
Sarımsaklı, Karataş
Sirkenli, Karataş
Tabaklar, Karataş
Tabur, Karataş
Terliksiz, Karataş
Topraklı, Karataş
Tuzkuyusu, Karataş
Tuzla, Karataş
Yanlızca, Karataş
Yassıören, Karataş
Yemişli, Karataş
Yenice, Karataş
Yenimurat, Karataş
Yüzbaşı, Karataş
Çakırören, Karataş
Çakşırlı, Karataş
Çavuşlu, Karataş
Çimeli, Karataş
Çukurkamış, Karataş
İnnaplıhüyüğü, Karataş
İsahacılı, Karataş

Kozan

Acarmantaş, Kozan
Akarca, Kozan
Akdam, Kozan
Akkaya, Kozan
Akçalıuşağı, Kozan
Alapınar, Kozan
Andıl, Kozan
Arslanlı, Kozan
Aydın, Kozan
Ayşehoca, Kozan
Bağözü, Kozan
Boztahta, Kozan
Bucakköy, Kozan
Bulduklu, Kozan
Damyeri, Kozan
Dağlıca, Kozan
Dikilitaş, Kozan
Dilekkaya, Kozan
Doğanalanı, Kozan
Duraluşağı, Kozan
Durmuşlu, Kozan
Düzağaç, Kozan
Ergenuşağı, Kozan
Eskikabasakal, Kozan
Eskimantaş, Kozan
Faydalı, Kozan
Ferhatlı, Kozan
Gaziköy, Kozan
Gedikli, Kozan
Gökgöz, Kozan
Gökçeyol, Kozan
Güneri, Kozan
Hacıbeyli, Kozan
Hacımirzalı, Kozan
Henüzçakırı, Kozan
Ilıcaköy, Kozan
Işıkkaya, Kozan
Işıklı, Kozan
Kabaktepe, Kozan
Kalkumaç, Kozan
Kapıkaya, Kozan
Karabucak, Kozan
Karacaören, Kozan
Karahamzalı, Kozan
Karanebili, Kozan
Kemer, Kozan
Kozan
Kuytucak, Kozan
Kuyubeli, Kozan
Kuyuluk, Kozan
Köseli, Kozan
Kıbrıslar, Kozan
Kızlarsekisi, Kozan
Kızıllar, Kozan
Mahyalar, Kozan
Marankeçili, Kozan
Minnetli, Kozan
Oruçlu, Kozan
Pekmezci, Kozan
Postkabasakal, Kozan
Salmanlı, Kozan
Tepecikören, Kozan
Tufanlı, Kozan
Turgutlu, Kozan
Turunçlu, Kozan
Velicanlı, Kozan
Yanalerik, Kozan
Yassıçalı, Kozan
Yeniköy, Kozan
Yukarıkeçili, Kozan
Yüksekören, Kozan
Zerdali, Kozan
Çamdere, Kozan
Çamlarca, Kozan
Çandık, Kozan
Çelenuşağı, Kozan
Çobanpınarı, Kozan
Çokak, Kozan
Çukurören, Kozan
Çulluuşağı, Kozan
Çürüklü, Kozan
Örendere, Kozan
Özbaşı, Kozan
İdemköy, Kozan
Şerifli, Kozan

Pozantı

Akçatekir, Pozantı
Alpu, Pozantı
Aşçıbekirli, Pozantı
Belemedik, Pozantı
Dağdibi, Pozantı
Eskikonacık, Pozantı
Fındıklı, Pozantı
Gökbez, Pozantı
Hamidiye, Pozantı
Kamışlı, Pozantı
Karakışlakçı, Pozantı
Pozantı
Yazıcık, Pozantı
Yağlıtaş, Pozantı
Yenikonacık, Pozantı
Yukarıbelemedik, Pozantı
Çamlıbel, Pozantı
Ömerli, Pozantı

Saimbeyli

Aksaağaç, Saimbeyli
Avcıpınarı, Saimbeyli
Ayvacık, Saimbeyli
Beypınarı, Saimbeyli
Cumhurlu, Saimbeyli
Cıvıklı, Saimbeyli
Değirmenciuşağı, Saimbeyli
Eyüplü, Saimbeyli
Gökmenler, Saimbeyli
Gürleşen, Saimbeyli
Halilbeyli, Saimbeyli
Himmetli, Saimbeyli
Kandilli, Saimbeyli
Kapaklıkuyu, Saimbeyli
Karakuyu, Saimbeyli
Kızılağaç, Saimbeyli
Mahmutlu, Saimbeyli
Naltaş, Saimbeyli
Payamburnu, Saimbeyli
Saimbeyli
Tülü, Saimbeyli
Yardibi, Saimbeyli
Yeniköy, Saimbeyli
Çatak, Saimbeyli
Çeralan, Saimbeyli
Çorak, Saimbeyli

Sarıçam

Akkuyu, Sarıçam
Baklalı, Sarıçam
Buruk, Sarıçam
Cihadiye, Sarıçam
Kürkçüler, Sarıçam
Sarıçam, Adana
Sofulu, Sarıçam
Suluca, Sarıçam
İncirlik, Sarıçam

Seyhan

Büyükdikili, Seyhan
Büyükçıldırım, Seyhan
Camuzcu, Seyhan
Dervişler, Seyhan
Dörtağaç, Seyhan
Gökçeler, Seyhan
Gölbaşı, Seyhan
Hadırlı, Seyhan
Karakuyu, Seyhan
Karayusuflu, Seyhan
Karslı, Seyhan
Kayışlı, Seyhan
Kireçocağı, Seyhan
Koyuncu, Seyhan
Kurttepe, Seyhan
Kuyumcular, Seyhan
Köylüoğlu, Seyhan
Küçükdikili, Seyhan
Küçükçıldırım, Seyhan
Mürseloğlu, Seyhan
Salmanbeyli, Seyhan
Sarıhamzalı, Seyhan
Sarıhuğlar, Seyhan
Seyhan, Seyhan
Yalmanlı, Seyhan
Yenidam, Seyhan
Yolgeçen, Seyhan
Zeytinli, Seyhan
Çakalkuyusu, Seyhan
Çaputçu, Seyhan
Çukurova, Adana

Tufanbeyli

Akpınar, Tufanbeyli
Akçal, Tufanbeyli
Ayvat, Tufanbeyli
Bozgüney, Tufanbeyli
Damlalı, Tufanbeyli
Demiroluk, Tufanbeyli
Doğanbeyli, Tufanbeyli
Doğanlı, Tufanbeyli
Evci, Tufanbeyli
Fatmakuyu, Tufanbeyli
Güzelim, Tufanbeyli
Hanyeri, Tufanbeyli
Karsavuran, Tufanbeyli
Kayapınar, Tufanbeyli
Kayarcık, Tufanbeyli
Kirazlıyurt, Tufanbeyli
Koçcağız, Tufanbeyli
Ortaköy, Tufanbeyli
Pekmezli, Tufanbeyli
Polatpınarı, Tufanbeyli
Pınarlar, Tufanbeyli
Taşpınar, Tufanbeyli
Tufanbeyli
Tozlu, Tufanbeyli
Yamanlı, Tufanbeyli
Yeşilova, Tufanbeyli
Çakırlar, Tufanbeyli
Çatalçam, Tufanbeyli
Çukurkışla, Tufanbeyli
İğdebel, Tufanbeyli
Şarköy, Tufanbeyli

Yumurtalık

Asmalı, Yumurtalık
Ayvalık, Yumurtalık
Demirtaş, Yumurtalık
Deveciuşağı, Yumurtalık
Gölovası, Yumurtalık
Hamzalı, Yumurtalık
Haylazlı, Yumurtalık
Kaldırım, Yumurtalık
Kalemli, Yumurtalık
Kesmeburun, Yumurtalık
Kuzupınarı, Yumurtalık
Kırmızıdam, Yumurtalık
Narlıören, Yumurtalık
Sugözü, Yumurtalık
Yahşiler, Yumurtalık
Yeniköy, Yumurtalık
Yeşilköy, Yumurtalık
Yumurtalık
Zeytinbeli, Yumurtalık

Yüreğir

Abdioğlu, Yüreğir
Aflak, Yüreğir
Akdam, Yüreğir
Akpınar, Yüreğir
Alihocalı, Yüreğir
Avcılar, Yüreğir
Aydıncık, Yüreğir
Aydınyurdu, Yüreğir
Ayvalı, Yüreğir
Ağzıbüyük, Yüreğir
Bayramhacılı, Yüreğir
Belören, Yüreğir
Beyceli, Yüreğir
Boynuyoğun, Yüreğir
Boztepe, Yüreğir
Büyükkapılı, Yüreğir
Camili, Yüreğir
Cerenli, Yüreğir
Danışment, Yüreğir
Dedepınarı, Yüreğir
Denizkuyusu, Yüreğir
Doğankent, Yüreğir
Dutluca, Yüreğir
Düzce, Yüreğir
Esenler, Yüreğir
Eğeciuşağı, Yüreğir
Geçitli, Yüreğir
Gökbüket, Yüreğir
Güveloğlu, Yüreğir
Hacıali, Yüreğir
Hakkıbeyli, Yüreğir
Hasanbeyli, Yüreğir
Havutlu, Yüreğir
Herekli, Yüreğir
Hocallı, Yüreğir
Irmakbaşı, Yüreğir
Kadıköy, Yüreğir
Karaahmetli, Yüreğir
Karayusuflu, Yüreğir
Karaömerli, Yüreğir
Kargakekeç, Yüreğir
Karlık, Yüreğir
Kayarlı, Yüreğir
Kaşlıca, Yüreğir
Kaşobası, Yüreğir
Kepeztepe, Yüreğir
Köklüce, Yüreğir
Kösefakılı, Yüreğir
Kütüklü, Yüreğir
Kılbaş, Yüreğir
Kılıçlı, Yüreğir
Kızılkaş, Yüreğir
Maltepe, Yüreğir
Menekşe, Yüreğir
Mustafalar, Yüreğir
Paşaköy, Yüreğir
Sarıçam, Yüreğir
Sağdıçlı, Yüreğir
Solaklı, Yüreğir
Turunçlu, Yüreğir
Vayvaylı, Yüreğir
Yakapınar, Yüreğir
Yarımca, Yüreğir
Yağızlar, Yüreğir
Yeniköy, Yüreğir
Yeniyayla, Yüreğir
Yerdelen, Yüreğir
Yukarıçiçekli, Yüreğir
Yunusoğlu, Yüreğir
Yüreğir
Zağarlı, Yüreğir
Çamlıca, Yüreğir
Çarkıpare, Yüreğir
Çatalpınar, Yüreğir
Çaylı, Yüreğir
Çağırganlı, Yüreğir
Çelemli, Yüreğir
Çine, Yüreğir
Çirişgediği, Yüreğir
Çiçekli, Yüreğir
Çotlu, Yüreğir
Çınarlı, Yüreğir
Ünlüce, Yüreğir
Şahinağa, Yüreğir
Şıhmurat, Yüreğir
İncirlik, Yüreğir
İncirlik Hava Üssü

İmamoğlu

Alaybeyi, İmamoğlu
Ayvalı, İmamoğlu
Ağzıkaraca, İmamoğlu
Camili, İmamoğlu
Danacılı, İmamoğlu
Faydalı, İmamoğlu
Hacıhasanlı, İmamoğlu
Koyunevi, İmamoğlu
Malıhıdırlı, İmamoğlu
Otluk, İmamoğlu
Sayca, İmamoğlu
Saygeçit, İmamoğlu
Sevinçli, İmamoğlu
Sokutaş, İmamoğlu
Ufacıkören, İmamoğlu
Uluçınar, İmamoğlu
Yazıtepe, İmamoğlu
Çörten, İmamoğlu
Üçtepe, İmamoğlu
İmamoğlu, Adana

Recent development

According to Law act no 6360, all Turkish provinces with a population more than 750 000, were renamed as metropolitan municipality. All districts in those provinces became second level municipalities and all villages in those districts  were renamed as a neighborhoods . Thus the villages listed above are officially neighborhoods of Adana.

External links
Turkstat

Adana
List
Mediterranean Region, Turkey